Ham Street Woods is a  biological Site of Special Scientific Interest south of Ashford in Kent.

This semi-natural wood is more than 400 years old, and it has rich and diverse invertebrates, including 12 rare or scarce dead wood species, such as the nationally rare beetle, Tomoxia biguttata.

There is access from the Greensand Way, which crosses the site. The wood comprises Barrow Wood, Bourne Wood and Carter's Wood, the latter two having residential roads named after them in Hamstreet.

References

Borough of Ashford
Forests and woodlands of Kent
Sites of Special Scientific Interest in Kent
National nature reserves in England
Nature Conservation Review sites